God Is My Co-Pilot may refer to:
God Is My Co-Pilot (book), a 1943 memoir by Gen. Robert Lee Scott Jr., USAF (ret)
God Is My Co-Pilot (film), a 1945 film based on the above book
God Is My Co-Pilot (band), a band from New York City

See also
Co-pilot (disambiguation)